Funambule is the fourth studio album by French slam poet Grand Corps Malade, with musical direction by musician and trumpet player Ibrahim Maalouf. The 13-track album, released 28 October 2013, includes a track featuring Frédéric Yonnet, as well as three duets with Sandra Nkaké, Francis Cabrel and Richard Bohringer.

Funambule is Grand Corps Malade's first album produced with independent record label Believe Recording and Anouche Productions, after he left the commercial AZ label associated with Universal Music France.

The album release came after Grand Corps Malade published his successful book, Patients, which was later adapted into a movie.

Track listing
"Au théâtre" (4:25)
"J'ai mis des mots" (ft Fredéric Yonnet) (3:28)
"Le manège" (4:12)
"Te manquer" (duet with Sandra Nkaké) (4:06)
"Funambule" (4:35)
"Les lignes de la main" (2:14)
"Pause" (3:36)
"Le bout du tunnel" (4:21)
"La traversée" (duet with Francis Cabrel) (4:19)
"Les 5 sens" (3:35)
"Course contre la honte" (duet with Richard Bohringer) (6:19)
"Tant que les gens font l'amour" (4:49)
"Dans les vagues" (4:28) - (Bonus track)

The physical album comes with a booklet titled Funambule by Grand Corps Malade.

Special instrumental edition
The physical album also includes two free CDs; the first contains the musical tracks while the second has instrumental versions of the same songs.

Charts

Weekly charts

Year-end charts

References

2013 albums
Grand Corps Malade albums
2010s spoken word albums